Nastra julia, the Julia's skipper, is a species of butterfly in the family Hesperiidae. It is found in North America from southern Texas to central Mexico.

The wingspan is 24–29 mm. Adults are on wing year-round in southern Texas and from April to October in the rest of the range.

The larvae feed on Cynodon dactylon. Adults feed on flower nectar.

External links
Butterflies and Moths of North America

Hesperiinae